The Picture was an Australian men's magazine published that was launched in 1988. It has been described as softcore pornography and was classified with a Mature (M) rating. The magazine was based in Sydney and was published weekly. The Picture was read by 31,000 people a week in 2012; figures from after 2012 are not available as then publisher Australian Consolidated Press withdrew the magazine from circulation audits following drops in sales.

In October 2019, then publisher Bauer Media Group announced that The Picture would be cease publication following their issue released on 23 December 2019. Bauer stated declining sales were responsible for the magazine's closure, with the news coming after both 7-Eleven and BP announced they would no longer sell the magazine due to its sexualised content.

References

External links
 Record at the National Library of Australia
 Magazine's page at ACP Magazines (broken link June 2020)

1988 establishments in Australia
2019 disestablishments in Australia
ACP magazine titles
Bauer Media Group
Defunct magazines published in Australia
Magazines established in 1988
Magazines disestablished in 2019
Magazines published in Sydney
Men's magazines published in Australia
Weekly magazines published in Australia